Kamenica (Cyrillic: Каменица, also spelled as Kamenitsa, from the word kamen – "stone" and the suffix -ica) is a Slavic toponym that  may refer to:

Albania
 Kamenica Tumulus (Tuma e Kamenicës), a neolithic tumulus close to Kamenicë, Korçë
 Kamenicë, Korçë, a settlement in Korçë County
 Kamicë-Flakë (Kamenicë), a settlement in the Qendër municipality, Malësi e Madhe District, Shkodër County, northern Albania

Belarus 
 Kamyenyets, a town in the Brest Region

Bosnia and Herzegovina

Federation of Bosnia and Herzegovina
 Kamenica (Drvar), a settlement near Drvar
 Kamenica (Ilijaš), a settlement near Ilijaš
 Kamenica (Maglaj), a village in the municipality of Maglaj
 Kamenica (Vogošća), a settlement near Vogošća
 , a village near Zavidovići

Republika Srpska
 Kamenica (Pale), a settlement near Pale
 , a village near Teslić
 Kamenica (Čelinac), a settlement near Čelinac
 Kamenica (Višegrad), a settlement near Višegrad
 , a settlement near Zvornik
 , a settlement near Zvornik

Bulgaria
Kamenitsa, Blagoevgrad Province, a village in Strumyani Municipality, in Blagoevgrad Province
, a village in Mirkovo Municipality, in Sofia Province
Kamenitsa (neighbourhood), a residential neighbourhood of Plovdiv
the former village of Kamenitsa, today a part of Velingrad

Croatia
 Kamenica, Varaždin County, a village near Lepoglava
 Kamenica Skradnička, a village near Tounj
 , a village near Brinje

Germany
 Kamenz, a Lusatian town in eastern Saxony
 Chemnitz (from Sorbian: Kamjenica), the third-largest city in Saxony

Kosovo
 Kamenica, Kosovo (Kamenicë), a town and municipality
 Kamenica, Leposavić, a village in Leposavić Municipality
 , a village in Zvečan Municipality

North Macedonia
 Makedonska Kamenica, a town and municipality

Serbia
 Kamenica (Aleksinac), a village in the municipality of Aleksinac
 Kamenica (Bojnik), a village in the municipality of Bojnik
 Kamenica (Dimitrovgrad), a village in the municipality of Dimitrovgrad
 Kamenica (Gornji Milanovac), a village in the municipality of Gornji Milanovac
 Kamenica (Koceljeva), a village in the municipality of Koceljeva
 Kamenica (Kragujevac), a village in the municipality of Kragujevac
 Kamenica (Kraljevo), a village in Kraljevo municipality
 Kamenica (Loznica), a village in the municipality of Loznica
 Kamenica (Niš), a village in the city municipality of Pantelej, city of Niš
 Kamenica (Užice), a village in the municipality of Užice
 Kamenica (Valjevo), a village in the municipality of Valjevo
 Sremska Kamenica, a suburb of Novi Sad
 Mala Kamenica, a village in the municipality of Negotin
 Velika Kamenica, a village in the municipality of Kladovo
 Donja Kamenica, a village in the municipality of Knjaževac
 Gornja Kamenica, a village in the municipality of Knjaževac

Slovakia
 Kamenica, a village in the Sabinov district in the Prešov Region
 Kamenica nad Cirochou, a village in the Humenné district in the Prešov Region
 Kamenica nad Hronom, a municipality and village in the Nitra Region
 Nižná Kamenica, a village and municipality in the Kosice Region
 Vyšná Kamenica, a village and municipality in the Kosice Region

Slovenia
 Kamenica, Metlika, a village in the Municipality of Metlika, southeastern Slovenia
 Kamenica, Sevnica, a village in the Municipality of Sevnica, central Slovenia

Yeshivas (Jewish schools)
 Kaminetz Yeshiva, Orthodox Jewish Talmudic college in Belarus before World War II
 Yeshiva Toras Emes Kaminetz, Orthodox Jewish school (Pre-K through high school), in Brooklyn, NY
 Yeshivas Kaminetz (Jerusalem), founded 1945 in Israel

Other uses
 , a river in western Serbia, tributary of West Morava River
 , a river in northern Bulgaria, tributary of the Vit
 Kamenitsa (Rilska River), a river in western Bulgaria, tributary of Rilska River
 Kamenitsa Peak (Pirin) in the Pirin Mountains in western Bulgaria
 Kamenitsa Peak (Balkan Mountains) in the Balkan Mountains, Bulgaria
 , a region in western Bulgaria
 , a basin in western Bulgaria
 Kamenica Church, a medieval Eastern Orthodox church in Donja Kamenica, Knjaževac Municipality
 Kasim Kamenica (born 1954), Bosnian and Herzegovian Croatian handball coach and former handball player

See also
Kamenice (disambiguation)
Kamenitsa (disambiguation)
Kamenitza
Kamenitza (Geomorphology) are closed depressions that develop on rock surfaces in karst regions formed by dissolution weathering.
Kamienica (disambiguation)
Kamenicky (disambiguation)
Kamenica Sasa (disambiguation)